Parros is a surname. Notable people with the surname include:

George Parros (born 1979), American ice hockey player
Peter Parros (born 1960), American actor and screenwriter
Rick Parros (born 1958), American football player

See also
Dave Parro (born 1957), Canadian ice hockey player